Kleb Basket Ferrara is an Italian professional basketball team that competes in the Serie A2 Basket league.

For sponsorship reasons, it has also been called Top Secret Ferrara.

Notable players
- Set a club record or won an individual award as a professional player.
- Played at least one official international match for his senior national team at any time.
  Pietro Ugolini
  Patrick Baldassarre
  A.J. Pacher

References

External links
Presentation at Eurobasket.com
Presentation at Proballers

Basketball teams established in 2011
Basketball teams in Emilia-Romagna
Ferrara